Néstor Salinas Alonso (born 28 February 1993) is a Spanish footballer who plays for SD Ejea as a midfielder.

Club career
Born in Cabanillas, Navarre, Salinas graduated with Athletic Bilbao's youth setup, and made his debuts as a senior with the farm team in 2011, in Tercera División. On 31 August 2013 he was loaned to SD Amorebieta in Segunda División B, in a season-long deal.

On 26 May 2014 Salinas was assigned to the reserves also in the third division, after his loan expired. He appeared in 34 matches for the side during the campaign, as it returned to Segunda División after a 19-year absence.

On 29 June 2015 Salinas was released by the Lions, and signed a two-year deal with CD Mirandés on 4 July. He made his debut as a professional on 23 August, coming on as a second-half substitute for Fran Carnicer in a 1–1 home draw against Real Zaragoza.

Salinas scored his first professional goal on 10 October 2015, netting his team's third in a 4–1 away routing of Elche CF, through a penalty. He finished the campaign with seven goals in 34 appearances, being the club's top goalscorer along with Lago Junior and Álex García.

References

External links

1993 births
Living people
People from Tudela (comarca)
Spanish footballers
Footballers from Navarre
Association football midfielders
Segunda División players
Segunda División B players
Tercera División players
CD Basconia footballers
SD Amorebieta footballers
Bilbao Athletic footballers
CD Mirandés footballers
RCD Mallorca players
SD Ponferradina players
CD Tudelano footballers
SD Ejea players
Athletic Bilbao footballers